"Rumour Mill" is a song by British drum and bass band Rudimental. It features vocals from Anne-Marie and Will Heard. The song was recorded for Rudimental's second album, We the Generation and was released as the fourth single on 28 August 2015.

Commercial performance
The song reached number 67 on the UK Singles Chart for week ending 4 July 2015.

Charts

Certifications

References

2015 singles
2015 songs
Anne-Marie (singer) songs
Rudimental songs
Will Heard songs
Song recordings produced by Rudimental
Songs written by MNEK
Songs written by Jess Glynne
Songs written by Will Heard